Wilhelmina "Mina" Wylie (27 June 1891 – 6 July 1984) was one of Australia's first two female Olympic swimming representatives, along with friend Fanny Durack.

Early life
Wylie grew up in South Coogee, Sydney, where her father Henry Wylie built Wylie's Baths in 1907.  The Baths are the oldest surviving communal sea baths in Australia.

Career
After competing against each other in the Australian and New South Wales Swimming Championships during the 1910/11 swimming season, Wylie and Durack persuaded officials to let them attend the 1912 Summer Olympics in Stockholm, Sweden, where women's swimming events were being held for the first time.  Durack won a gold medal, and Wylie a silver medal.  Twenty-seven women contested the 100-metre event, including six from Great Britain and four from Germany. Swimsuits generally reached down to the mid-thigh, although some were sleeveless.  The pool was built in an inlet of Stockholm Harbour, and competitors swam without lane ropes.  Durack's time in the 100-metre final was 1:22.2, and Wylie's was 1:25.4.

Wylie competed in New South Wales and Australian championships from 1906 to 1934, winning 115 titles, including every Australian and New South Wales championship event in 1911, 1922 and 1924 in freestyle, backstroke and breaststroke. She was inducted into the International Swimming Hall of Fame in 1975.

On 27 June 2021, to celebrate what would have been her 130th birthday, Wylie was honoured with a Google Doodle for Australian users.

See also
 List of members of the International Swimming Hall of Fame
 List of Olympic medalists in swimming (women)

References

External links

 
 
 
 Wilhelmina (Mina) Wylie collection at the State Library of New South Wales
 ABC article on the 1912 Stockholm Games
 "Too much Boldness and Rudeness - Australia's first Olympic Ladies Swimming Team" National Centre for History Education (Peter Cochrane)

1891 births
1984 deaths
Olympic swimmers of Australasia
Swimmers at the 1912 Summer Olympics
Olympic silver medalists for Australasia
Medalists at the 1912 Summer Olympics
Australian female freestyle swimmers
Australian female breaststroke swimmers
Australian female backstroke swimmers
Olympic silver medalists in swimming
Sport Australia Hall of Fame inductees
20th-century Australian women
21st-century Australian women